Asian Highway 14 (AH14) is a road in the Asian Highway Network running  from Hai Phong, Vietnam to Mandalay, Myanmar connecting AH1 to AH3 in Kunming, Yunnan, China and eventually to AH2. The route is as follows:

Vietnam
  Hanoi–Haiphong Expressway: Hai Phong–Hanoi
  Noi Bai–Lao Cai Expressway: Hanoi - Lào Cai

China
 : Hekou - Kaiyuan
 : Kaiyuan - Kunming
 : Kunming - Zhen'an - Mangshi - Ruili

Myanmar
 National Highway 3: Muse - Lashio - Mandalay

References

Asian Highway Network
Roads in Myanmar
Roads in China
Roads in Vietnam